Werner Siegfried Friedeman Gerhardt (3 February 1907 – 1966) was a South African athlete who competed in the 1930 British Empire Games.

At the 1930 Empire Games he won the bronze medal with the South African relay in the 4×110 yards event as well as in the 4×440 yards competition. In the 100 yards contest he finished fifth and in the 220 yards event he finished sixth.

Competition record

External links
Profile at trackfield.brinkster.net

1907 births
1966 deaths
South African male sprinters
Athletes (track and field) at the 1930 British Empire Games
Commonwealth Games bronze medallists for South Africa
Commonwealth Games medallists in athletics
South African people of German descent
Date of death missing
Place of death missing
Place of birth missing
20th-century South African people
Medallists at the 1930 British Empire Games